Stephanie Goddard is a German former footballer who played as a midfielder for Werder Bremen in the Frauen-Bundesliga. She previously played for FCR 2001 Duisburg (with whom she won the 2008–09 UEFA Women's Cup) and SG Essen-Schönebeck in the Bundesliga and Hampton Roads Piranhas in the United States' W-League.

As an Under–19 international she won the 2007 U–19 European Championship.

Goddard retired from playing in May 2021, aged 33.

References

External links
 

1988 births
Living people
German women's footballers
Women's association football midfielders
Women's association football forwards
Frauen-Bundesliga players
FCR 2001 Duisburg players
SGS Essen players
SV Werder Bremen (women) players
Expatriate women's soccer players in the United States
People from Rinteln
Footballers from Lower Saxony